Englee is a small fishing community on the east side of the Great Northern Peninsula in a sheltered harbour on the northern headland of Canada Bay, on the island of Newfoundland in the Canadian province of   Newfoundland and Labrador.

Demographics 

See also
 List of cities and towns in Newfoundland and Labrador
 List of people from Newfoundland and Labrador

References

External links
 Pictures of the town
 Englee - Encyclopedia of Newfoundland and Labrador, vol.1, p. 778.

Populated coastal places in Canada
Towns in Newfoundland and Labrador